Chlamydonella apoprostomata is a species of littoral ciliates, first found near King George Island.

References

Phyllopharyngea
Species described in 2008